The 1952 Giro di Lombardia, 46th edition of the race, was held on 26 October 1952.

General classification

Final general classification

References

1952
1952 in road cycling
1952 in Italian sport
1952 Challenge Desgrange-Colombo